Scutellaria lateriflora, (commonly "blue skullcap", "mad dog skullcap",, "American skullcap", "side-flowering skullcap", etc.) is a hardy perennial herb of the mint family, Lamiaceae, native to North America.

It has an upright habit, growing   in maximum height. It is a wetland-loving species and grows near marshes, meadows, and another wet habitat. Most of the flowers do not appear at the top of the main stem but are produced along the length of side branches that grow from the leaf axils.

Other skullcaps (Scutellaria) species include common skullcap (S. galericulata), western skullcap (S. canescens), and southern skullcap (S. cordifolia).

Phytochemicals

The principal phytochemicals are polyphenols in the leaves, stems, and roots of some Scutellaria species, including baicalin, baicalein, wogonin, and oroxylin A. Other constituents include lateriflorin, melatonin, serotonin, viscidulin III-2’-O-glucoside, Chyrin-6-C-ara-glc, trans-verbascoside, viscidulin, trans-martynoside, oroxylin A-7-O-glc, wogonoside, chitin, and scutellarin. Scutellaria lateriflora contains flavonoids.

One study identified 5,6,7-trihydroxy-2'- methoxyflavone and its 7-O-glucuronide. Scutellarin is a flavone found in S. lateriflora and S. barbata. It is transformed by hydrolysis into scutellarein.

Genkwanin, hesperetin, quercetin, rutin, naringenin, chrysin, and daidzein are the flavonoids found in S. lateriflora. The flavonoids are readily extracted using hot water.

The oil from S. lateriflora contains τ-cadinene, calamenene, β-elemene, α-cubebene, and α-humulene.

Traditional uses and research
Its extracts are used in herbal medicine intended as a mild sedative and sleep promoter. Cherokee women have used it as an emmenagogue. In 1773, Scutellaria lateriflora became a common treatment in North America for the hysteria and hydrophobia caused by rabies.

Skullcap products have been analyzed, with some adulterated by Teucrium canadense or T. chamaedrys, also known as germander, which contains potentially hepatotoxic diterpenes.

References

External links
 Connecticut Botanical Society: Scutellaria lateriflora
 Plants For A Future: Scutellaria lateriflora
 USDA Plants Profile: Scutellaria lateriflora
 Dr. Duke's Phytochemical and Ethnobotanical Databases

lateriflora
Herbs
Flora of Canada
Flora of the United States
Medicinal plants
Plants described in 1753
GABAA receptor positive allosteric modulators
Dopamine reuptake inhibitors
Anxiolytics
Taxa named by Carl Linnaeus